Viacheslav Ponomarenko is a lieutenant colonel of the Armed Forces of Ukraine and a participant in the Russo-Ukrainian war. He is Hero of Ukraine with the award of the Order of the Golden Star. He plays rugby union for the Ukraine national rugby union team.

Awards 
 The title of Hero of Ukraine with the award of the Order of the Golden Star (2022) — for personal courage and heroism shown in the defense of the state sovereignty and territorial integrity of Ukraine, loyalty to the military oath.

Rugby union 
Ponomarenko is a centre for the Ukraine national team and is a member of RC Olymp which plays in the Ukraine Rugby Superliga.

References

External links 
president.gov.ua About conferring the title of Hero of Ukraine

1982 births
Living people
Recipients of the Order of Gold Star (Ukraine)
Rugby union centres
Ukrainian rugby union players